Maurice Gerald Flitcroft (23 November 1929 – 24 March 2007) was a British golfer.

Flitcroft, who had never attempted a round of golf in his life, received widespread attention after shooting a score of 121 in the qualifying competition for the 1976 Open Championshipthe worst score recorded at the Open Championship by a self-professed "professional golfer". Subsequently, he gained significant media coverage, being referred to as "the world's worst golfer".

Early life 
Flitcroft was born in Manchester on 23 November 1929.

After leaving school, Flitcroft joined the Merchant Navy. Following his marriage, he and his wife settled in Barrow-in-Furness, where he worked as a crane operator at the Vickers-Armstrongs shipyard. At other times he worked as a shoe polish salesman and an ice cream man.

In a July 2006 article in Golfonline, Flitcroft said, "I was in show business. I toured with a revue, and I used to jump into a tank on the stage, I was a stuntcomedy high diver. The revue used to tour all the country and I would dive into this tank. It wasn't all glass, just the front so the spectators could see what was going on under the water."

Golf career
According to his unpublished memoirs, Flitcroft took up the game after watching the 1974 Piccadilly World Match Play Championship. Flitcroft had golfing ambitions well above his ability and came to notoriety in 1976 when, posing as a professional golfer, he managed to obtain a place to play in the qualifying round of The Open Championship — despite his previous experience amounting only to some hacking around on playing fields near his home. Flitcroft recalled, "I was looking to find fame and fortune but only achieved one of the two." He was inspired to enter the tournament by Walter Danecki, a postal worker from Milwaukee, Wisconsin, who entered the 1965 Open Championship after telling the R&A that he was a pro and set a two-round score of 221 during qualifying.

When he discovered, to his shock, that any amateurs entering competitions had to have an official handicap — something he lacked — he simply declared himself to be a professional. Flitcroft prepared for the tournament by studying a golf instruction manual by Peter Alliss which was borrowed from his local library. He further studied from instructional articles by Al Geiberger. and honed his skills on a nearby beach.

His deception (and ineptitude) were uncovered when he managed to card a 49-over-par 121 — the worst score in the tournament's history. Some of the other professionals playing with him were so angry that they successfully demanded a refund of their entry fees. Australian golfer Mike Cahill, who was playing directly behind Flitcroft, stated, "I just snapped at the 12th [hole] and accosted him," he later said. "I yelled at him that this wasn't a circus and told him to get off the course." In addition, the R&A gave him a lifetime ban from all their competitions. It seems that none of the professionals noticed that his gear comprised only a red imitation-leather bag and half a set of mail-order clubs. As a result of his abilities, he became known as "The Royal & Ancient Rabbit."

Following the 1976 Open, the rules were changed to prevent Flitcroft from attempting to enter again. Undeterred, he regularly attempted to enter the Open and several other golf competitions, either under his own name or under pseudonyms, such as Gene Paycheki (as in pay cheque), Gerrard Hoppy, and James Beau Jolley. Other more ludicrous names used were Arnold Palmtree and Count Manfred von Hoffmanstel, together with physical disguises such as wearing a false moustache and dark glasses.

After his initiation into celebrity golf, Flitcroft briefly became a C-list celebrity and had various golf trophies (usually those celebrating poor play or egregious mishaps) named after him; he also had the distinction of having the "Maurice Gerald Flitcroft Member-Guest Tournament" named after him by the 1988 Blythefield Country Club in Grand Rapids, Michigan. Buddy Whitten, Blythefield's head pro stated that, "It started as a lark, but most people can't break 90 so they relate more to Maurice than they would to a touring pro." By the time of the 22nd Maurice G. Flitcroft Member-Guest Tournament, which was held in May 2000, the club had featured a green with two holes so that even the most errant of approaches were potentially rewarded. If this wasn't enough, another green had a  cup.

In 1988, Flitcroft himself was flown to Blythefield to play in the event. He is reported as having told the members there that it was the first time he and his wife had been out of the house together "since their gas oven exploded." Whitten further said, "It was a different sort of experience, I'd never met a crane operator from England. But his game had gotten a little better than I expected. I think he shot in the low 90s." Flitcroft said of his performance, "I wasn't playing too well. Some faults had crept into my swing. But I hit a lot of good shots.”

Flitcroft retired from Vickers in the 1970s and devoted himself to his golf—but was reduced to the ignominy of once again playing on local fields, having been banned from every local golf club after sneaking into their grounds to play without permission.

In popular culture
He is the subject of a biography, The Phantom of the Open, by Scott Murray and Simon Farnaby, published by Yellow Jersey Press in July 2010.

In 2017, Farnaby stated that he was writing a film script based on the book. The Phantom of the Open, directed by Craig Roberts, starring Mark Rylance and Sally Hawkins, opened at the London Film Festival in October 2021 before a wider release in March 2022.

Personal life 
Flitcroft was married to Jean (died 2002) by whom he had two sons, one of whom caddied for him.

Death 
In its obituary of Flitcroft, The Daily Telegraph commented:

References

External links
 Obituary, "The Great Pretender: Recalling Open Championship gatecrasher Maurice Flitcroft," by Dave Kindred, GolfDigest, June 25, 2007
  Phantom of the Open, 2022

Impostors
Hoaxers
English male golfers
Sportspeople from Barrow-in-Furness
Sportspeople from Manchester
1929 births
2007 deaths